Hot Springs State Park is a public recreation area in Thermopolis, Wyoming, known for its hot springs, which flow at a constant temperature of . The state park offers free bathing at the State Bath House, where temperatures are moderated to a therapeutic . The petroglyph site at Legend Rock, some 25 miles away, is also part of the park. The park is managed by the Wyoming Division of State Parks and Historic Sites.

History
The land on which the state park sits was a cession agreement, and the ceded portion was purchased from the Eastern Shoshone by the federal government in 1896, when Indian Inspector James McLaughlin negotiated a purchase price of $60,000 for a 100-square-mile portion of the Shoshone reservation. A square-mile section of that land was released to the state in 1897 which became Wyoming's first state park, known as Big Horn Hot Springs State Reserve.

Features
The park features a managed herd of bison, a suspension foot bridge across the Big Horn River, picnic shelters, boat docks, flower gardens, and terraces made of naturally forming travertine (calcium carbonate) caused by a flowing mineral hot spring. The park area encompasses commercial hotels and several state-run and privately operated entities including the Gottsche Rehabilitation Center, Hot Springs County Memorial Hospital, the historic Callaghan Apartments/Plaza Hotel, the Star Plunge waterpark, the Tepee Pools waterpark, and the Wyoming Pioneer Home, a state-run, assisted-living facility.

Gallery

References

External links

Hot Springs State Park Wyoming State Parks, Historic Sites & Trails
Hot Springs State Park Brochure and Map Wyoming State Parks, Historic Sites & Trails

State parks of Wyoming
Hot springs of Wyoming
Protected areas established in 1897
Protected areas of Hot Springs County, Wyoming
Bodies of water Hot Springs County, Wyoming
IUCN Category III
1897 establishments in Wyoming